Malesherbia splendens is a subshrub native to the Lurín river basin of the Andean region of Peru. It is found at altitudes of 2100-3000m. It can grow up to 1 meter tall and has yellow/green flowers. It has low genetic diversity, potentially due to its small species range. It is currently classified as endangered due to low genetic diversity and diminishing species boundary due to the expansion of goat farming.

References 

Flora of Peru
Plants described in 1965
splendens